William Pyne may refer to:

 William Henry Pyne, English writer and painter
William Pyne (MP) for Melcombe Regis (UK Parliament constituency)

See also
William Pine (disambiguation)